Buduslău is a commune in Bihor County, Crișana, Romania. It is composed of two villages, Albiş (Albis) and Buduslău. In 2002, 94.5% of inhabitants were Hungarians, 3.9% Roma and 1.4% Romanians.

References

Communes in Bihor County
Localities in Crișana